Bazuka was an American instrumental R&B group, put together by the record producer Tony Camillo. They released a self-titled album on A&M Records in 1975 which featured the song "Dynomite", a #10 hit in the US Billboard pop chart that year. The single also peaked at #29 on the US R&B chart, #6 Hot Dance Club Play, and #11 Disco. The track peaked at #28 in the UK Singles Chart in June 1975. The follow-up single, "Love Explosion", was less successful, peaking at #92 on the US R&B chart.

Discography

Albums

Singles

References

American rhythm and blues musical groups